Greensmith is a surname, referring to a coppersmith. Notable people with the name include:

 Bill Greensmith (born 1930), English cricketer
 Gus Greensmith (born 1996), British rally driver
 Harry Greensmith (1899–1967), Australian rules footballer
 Ron Greensmith (born 1933), English footballer

English-language surnames
Occupational surnames
English-language occupational surnames